The Minister for Education and Welsh Language is a Cabinet minister in the Welsh Government who leads the Department for Education and Skills (DfES) (Welsh: Yr Adran Addysg a Sgiliau). The current officeholder is Jeremy Miles.

The Department is responsible for education, training and children's services in Wales under powers devolved from the Department for Children, Schools and Families of the UK government under Schedule 5 of the Government of Wales Act 2006.

Ministers

See also
 Education in Wales

References

External links
 Department for Education and Skills website

Welsh Government
Education in Wales
Wales